Wild Blue Yokohama was a large indoor pool complex located in Tsurumi-ku, Yokohama, Japan. The facility was operated by NKK Corp., a major Japanese steelmaker, and opened in June 1992 on unused land owned by NKK.

It closed on 31 August 2001 due to falling visitor numbers.

The complex contained an artificial rubber beach, decorated in a tropical theme, featuring artificially generated waves, heat lamps, and tanning booths.

See also
 List of water parks

References
 
 

Buildings and structures in Yokohama
Defunct amusement parks in Japan
Water parks in Japan
1992 establishments in Japan
2001 disestablishments in Japan